The Eye of the Scorpion is a Big Finish Productions audio drama based on the long-running British science fiction television series Doctor Who.

Plot
In ancient Egypt, the Fifth Doctor and Peri become involved in the intrigue surrounding the accession of a female Pharaoh. This play features the first appearance of the companion Erimem.

Cast
The Doctor — Peter Davison
Peri — Nicola Bryant
Erimem — Caroline Morris
Yanis — Harry Myers
Fayum — Jack Gallagher
Antranak — Jonathan Owen
Kishik — Daniel Brennan
Horemshep — Stephen Perring
Slave — Mark Wright
Priest — Alistair Lock

Notes
The Doctor claims that the Great Sphinx of Giza predates the neighbouring Giza pyramid complex by thousands of years, having been built by refugees from Atlantis. However, he may have been bluffing and nothing is confirmed.  Atlantis has been seen or mentioned in several TV serials, including The Underwater Menace, The Time Monster and The Dæmons.
After the Sphinx is damaged during the story, Peri causes it to be repaired with the face of Elvis Presley.
This story features an example of actress Nicola Bryant speaking in an English accent as Peri is affected by a form of alien mind control (as opposed to her usual American accent for the character).

External links
Big Finish Productions – The Eye of the Scorpion

Fifth Doctor audio plays
2001 audio plays
Fiction set in the 15th century BC